Aidyn Johnson (born 31 October 1997) is a former professional Australian rules footballer who played for the Port Adelaide Football Club in the Australian Football League (AFL). He was drafted by Port Adelaide with their second selection and forty-fifth overall in the 2015 national draft. He made his debut in the 90-point win against  at the Adelaide Oval in round five of the 2017 season after he was a late inclusion for the injured Hamish Hartlett. Johnson kicked a goal with his first kick.

References

External links

 

1997 births
Living people
Port Adelaide Football Club players
Port Adelaide Football Club players (all competitions)
Bendigo Pioneers players
Australian rules footballers from Victoria (Australia)
Indigenous Australian players of Australian rules football